This is a list of the National Register of Historic Places listings in Hamilton County, Texas.

This is intended to be a complete list of properties listed on the National Register of Historic Places in Hamilton County, Texas. There is one property listed on the National Register in the county. This property is also a State Antiquities Landmark and a Recorded Texas Historic Landmark.

Current listings

The locations of National Register properties may be seen in a mapping service provided.

|}

See also

National Register of Historic Places listings in Texas
Recorded Texas Historic Landmarks in Hamilton County

References

External links

Hamilton County, Texas
Hamilton County
Buildings and structures in Hamilton County, Texas